Alfred Louis Bush (1849–1902) was a 19th-century industrialist and politician in Los Angeles County, California.

History
Bush was born February 3, 1849, in Vriesland, Michigan, where he attended public schools until age 15. when he became a machinist's apprentice.

In 1870 he moved to South Bend, Indiana, where he formed a partnership, Bush and Palmeteer. The company built gasoline engines and other machines.

In his business life, he later consolidated his machinery business with the Burge Manufacturing Company to form the Bush and Burge Company.

Los Angeles
He moved to Los Angeles, California, and at age 23 he was elected in 1872 to the Los Angeles County Board of Supervisors from the 4th District. Ten years later, on December 4, 1882, he was elected to the Los Angeles Common Council from the 4th Ward for a two-year term, but he resigned on October 27, 1883.

He died on July 3, 1902, survived by his wife, Clara, and three children, Wilhelmine, Anna Louis, and Alfred Jr.

References

American industrialists
Businesspeople from Los Angeles
Los Angeles County Board of Supervisors
Los Angeles Common Council (1850–1889) members
19th-century American politicians
1849 births
1902 deaths
People from Ottawa County, Michigan
19th-century American businesspeople